Yemparala Venkateswara Rao is an Indian politician who served as Member of 13th Lok Sabha from Guntur Lok Sabha constituency. In 1999 Indian general election, he got 3,99,065 votes.

Personal life 
He was born in 1 March 1932 and married Rajeswari in 8 March 1950. He was educated from Hindu College, Guntur.

References 

Indian politicians
India MPs 1999–2004
1932 births
Living people